The 2022 Gambrinus Czech Darts Open was the sixth of thirteen PDC European Tour events on the 2022 PDC Pro Tour. The tournament took place at the Královka Arena, Prague, Czech Republic, from 13–15 May 2022. It featured a field of 48 players and £140,000 in prize money, with £25,000 going to the winner.

Jamie Hughes was the defending champion after defeating Stephen Bunting 8–3 in the 2019 final, but he failed to qualify for this tournament, so was unable to defend his title.

Luke Humphries won his second European Tour title with an 8–5 win over Rob Cross in the final.

Prize money
The prize money is unchanged from the European Tours of the last 3 years:

 Seeded players who lose in the second round and host nation qualifiers (who qualify automatically as a result of their ranking) who lose in their first match of the event shall not be credited with prize money on any Order of Merit. A player who qualifies as a qualifier, but later becomes a seed due to the withdrawal of one or more other players shall be credited with their prize money on all Orders of Merit regardless of how far they progress in the event.

Qualification and format
The top 16 entrants from the PDC ProTour Order of Merit on 29 March automatically qualified for the event and were seeded in the second round.

The remaining 32 places went to players from six qualifying events – 24 from the Tour Card Holder Qualifier (held on 8 April), two from the Associate Member Qualifier (held on 24 April), the two highest ProTour ranking Czech players, two from the Host Nation Qualifier (held on 12 May), one from the Nordic & Baltic Associate Member Qualifier (held on 19 February), and one from the East European Associate Member Qualifier (held on 23 April).

Fourth seed Peter Wright and Nordic and Baltic qualifier Niels Heinsøe withdrew from the tournament prior to the draw. Martin Schindler was promoted to 16th seed and two extra places were made available in the Host Nation Qualifier.

The following players took part in the tournament:

Top 16
  (second round)
  (quarter-finals)
  (semi-finals)
  (second round)
  (runner-up) 
  (second round)
  (third round)
  (second round)
  (third round)
  (champion)
  (third round)
  (second round)
  (second round)
  (second round)
  (second round)
  (second round)

Tour Card Qualifier
  (second round)
  (first round)
  (quarter-finals)
  (first round)
  (semi-finals)
  (first round)
  (second round)
  (first round)
  (first round)
  (third round)
  (third round)
  (third round)
  (first round)
  (quarter-finals)
  (third round)
  (first round)
  (second round)
  (third round)
  (first round)
  (first round)
  (second round)
  (first round)
  (second round)

Associate Member Qualifier
  (first round)
  (first round)

Highest Ranked Czechs
  (quarter-finals)
  (second round)

Host Nation Qualifier
  (first round)
  (first round)
  (second round)
  (first round)

East European Qualifier
  (first round)

Draw

Notes

References

2022 PDC Pro Tour
2022 PDC European Tour
2022 in Czech sport
Gambrinus Czech Darts Open
Darts in the Czech Republic